Brighton Beach Generating Station is a natural gas fired combined cycle fossil fuel power station in the Brighton Beach neighbourhood of Windsor, Ontario, Canada, owned by the Atura Power subsidiary of Ontario Power Generation. The electricity generated is under the control and marketing lead of Coral Energy Canada Inc. Gas for the plant is supplied by Union Gas, and cooling water is drawn from the Detroit River.

Description
The plant consists of:
Two General Electric 7FA gas turbine generators 
Two heat recovery steam generators
One General Electric D11 condensing steam turbine generator
Brighton Beach is connected into the Ontario grid via two 230 kV connections and one 115 kV connection, at the adjacent Keith transformer station owned by Hydro One Networks Inc.

References

Natural gas-fired power stations in Ontario
Buildings and structures in Windsor, Ontario
Joint ventures
ATCO
Ontario Power Generation